Little Nanay is a 2015 Philippine television drama series broadcast by GMA Network. It premiered on the network's Telebabad line up and worldwide on GMA Pinoy TV from November 16, 2015 to March 23, 2016, replacing My Faithful Husband on Beautiful Strangers timeslot.

Mega Manila ratings are provided by AGB Nielsen Philippines.

Series overview

Episodes

November 2015

December 2015

January 2016

February 2016

March 2016

References

Lists of Philippine drama television series episodes